Melaleuca basicephala is a plant in the myrtle family, Myrtaceae and is endemic to the south-west of Western Australia. It is a rarely-seen shrub from the dense freshwater swamps of the wet far south-west corner of the state.

Description

The stamens are in five bundles around the flower, each bundle with 17 to 23 pinkish-purple or mauve-pink stamens. Flowering occurs from November to February.

Taxonomy and naming
Melaleuca basicephala was first formally described in 1867 by George Bentham in Flora Australiensis. The specific epithet (basicephala) is from the latinised Greek basis meaning "base" and -cephalus meaning "headed" referring "to the inflorescences usually being at the base of lateral shoots."

Distribution and habitat
This species occurs in dense swamps in the Augusta and Northcliffe districts in the Jarrah Forest and Warren biogeographic regions. It grows in black, peaty sand and clay in winter-wet flats and swamps.

Conservation
Melaleuca basicephala is classified as "Priority Four" by the Government of Western Australia Department of Parks and Wildlife meaning that it is rare or near threatened and in need of monitoring.

References

basicephala
Myrtales of Australia
Plants described in 1867
Endemic flora of Western Australia